Choi Dong-soo is a Korean name consisting of the family name Choi and the given name Dong-soo, and may also refer to:

 Choi Dong-soo (baseball) (born 1971), South Korean baseball player
 Choi Dong-soo (footballer) (born 1985), South Korean football player